Pedro Emanuel Moreira de Sousa (born 19 September 1990 in Rans, Penafiel), commonly known as Coronas, is a Portuguese professional footballer who plays for Leixões S.C. as a midfielder.

References

External links

1990 births
Living people
People from Penafiel
Sportspeople from Porto District
Portuguese footballers
Association football midfielders
Primeira Liga players
Liga Portugal 2 players
F.C. Penafiel players
Vitória F.C. players
Moreirense F.C. players
C.S. Marítimo players
Associação Académica de Coimbra – O.A.F. players
C.D. Cova da Piedade players
Leixões S.C. players